Dirck Dicx (1603 – after 1650), was a Dutch Golden Age brewer in Haarlem who moved to Brazil.

Biography
He was born in Haarlem as the son of the mayor by the same name who operated the brewery called Het Scheepje, Haarlem. He became the brewer of the Halve Maen in Haarlem and served in the local militia from 1626 onwards. His portrait as flag bearer of the blue brigade of the St. George militia was painted twice by Frans Hals, first  in his The Banquet of the Officers of the St George Militia Company in 1627, and the second time in his The Officers of the St George Militia Company in 1639. Since it was the custom for bachelors to be flag bearers, it is presumed that he never married, as he moved to the city of Recife - Brazil in 1640. There, he brewed the very first beer of the Americas, working for Johann Mauritius van Nassau-Siegen - Governor of the Dutch Territories in Brazil. Nothing more is known of him after 1650, when he was noted as still being out of the country.

References

1603 births
1650s deaths
People from Haarlem
Frans Hals